Cristian Vella (born March 6, 1978 in Rosario, Santa Fe, Argentina) is an Argentine footballer currently playing for Sportivo Belgrano of the Primera B Nacional Argentina.

References

External links
 Cristian Vella at BDFA.com.ar 

1978 births
Living people
Argentine footballers
Argentine expatriate footballers
Argentine Primera División players
Defensores de Belgrano footballers
Club Atlético Vélez Sarsfield footballers
All Boys footballers
Atlético de Rafaela footballers
Argentino de Rosario footballers
Association football central defenders
Footballers from Rosario, Santa Fe